Galster is a family tree surname. People with that name include:

 George Galster (born 1948), American Professor of Urban Affairs in the Department of Urban Studies & Planning at Wayne State University in Detroit, Michigan. 
 Karl Galster (1886-1916), German naval officer
 Steven R. Galster (born 1961), American environmental and human rights investigator and counter-trafficking program designer

See also
 Galdr, an Old Norse word for spell or incantation; galster in Old High German
 Galster Wilderness Park Nature Center, California
 German destroyer Z20 Karl Galster, 1937-1958